Raycho Karmadzhiev (born March 31, 1961) is a Bulgarian sprint canoer who competed in the early 1980s. At the 1980 Summer Olympics in Moscow, he finished seventh in the C-2 1000 m event.

References
Sports-Reference.com profile

1961 births
Bulgarian male canoeists
Canoeists at the 1980 Summer Olympics
Living people
Olympic canoeists of Bulgaria
Place of birth missing (living people)